Iridia is a genus of foraminifera belonging to the subfamily Tholosininae. It contains four species. The first species, I. diaphana, was discovered in the Querimba archipelago by scientists Edward Heron-Allen and Arthur Earland, who first described the genus in 1914.

References

Foraminifera genera